The 1995 Alabama Crimson Tide football team represented the University of Alabama for the 1995–96 college football season, competing in the Western Division in the Southeastern Conference. The team played their home games at Bryant–Denny Stadium in Tuscaloosa, Alabama, and Legion Field in Birmingham, Alabama. Gene Stallings led the Crimson Tide to an 8–3 record. Due to NCAA sanctions, no bowl appearance was made.

The early-season victory over Southern Miss came in dramatic fashion, as Alabama completed a 36-yard pass on 4th down for a go-ahead touchdown with under 30 seconds left in the game. The three games Alabama lost were also particularly noteworthy. The game against Arkansas featured a last-minute 4th-and-goal touchdown pass by Arkansas, giving them the win; however, replays later showed the ball was clearly caught. This call, along with a missed twelve-men-on-the-field penalty on Arkansas' final drive led to the suspension of the officiating crew the following week. The 41–14 blowout loss to Tennessee marked the Vols first win over the Tide since 1985, ending Alabama's 9-game unbeaten streak. The season-ending loss at Auburn also featured a questionable last-minute call regarding a pass. Alabama QB Freddie Kitchens had apparently hit Curtis Brown for a late go-ahead touchdown, but officials ruled Brown out of bounds.

Schedule

Source: Rolltide.com: 1995 Alabama football schedule

Roster

Coaching staff

Game summaries

Vanderbilt

Despite seven turnovers, Alabama was able to use a 23 point 4th quarter to survive a scare against Vanderbilt.

Southern Miss

For the second week in a row, Alabama would have to use a 4th quarter comeback to prevent an upset. Down 20–17 and facing a 4th and 16, Brian Burgdorf threw a 35 yard touchdown pass to Toderick Malone to give Alabama their first lead and the eventual win.

Arkansas

Despite holding a 9 point lead in the third quarter, Alabama could not hold on and would lose to Arkansas for the first time since the join the SEC in 1992.

Georgia

Bama defensive lineman Shannon Brown blocked a Georgia 27-yard field goal attempt. Deshea Townsend caught the ball and ran 90 yards for a touchdown. Defensive back Cedric Samuel returned a fumble 25 yards for a touchdown. DB Kevin Jackson took an interception back 36 yards for another score. UGA quarterback Hines Ward completed one pass and threw an interception before being replaced.

North Carolina State

Alabama would extend their non-conference winning streak to 19 as they would beat the Wolfpack on Homecoming.

Tennessee

For the first time since 1985, Tennessee would beat Alabama. The lose of 27 points was the largest margin of defeat at Legion Field since Tennessee replicated that score in 1969.

Ole Miss

The Alabama defense scored the first nine points of this game. Dwayne Rudd sacked the Ole Miss quarterback who fumbled the ball out of the back end zone for a safety. Later in the first quarter, linebacker Ralph Staten would return an interception 61 yards for a touchdown.

North Texas

After sleep walking through the first half, Alabama would use 28 points in the second half to pull away and win their 20th straight non conference game.

LSU

Early in the fourth quarter, Deshea Townsend intercepted a Jamie Howard pass and returned it 17 yards to the LSU 21-yard line. A few plays later, Dennis Riddle would convert a 2-yard touchdown run that proved to be the difference in Alabama's 10-3 win.

Mississippi State

For the first time all year, Alabama would not commit a turnover in a game and would use their defense to win for the second week in a row.

Auburn

Despite gaining a season high 478 yards of offense and a valiant comeback effort in the second half, Alabama could not score enough points to beat Auburn.

References

Alabama
Alabama Crimson Tide football seasons
Alabama Crimson Tide football